Mount Hack, also known as Yarrngarri Arraindanha Vambata, is a mountain peak in the Flinders Ranges of South Australia  located in the locality of Warraweena.

According to the book Chequered Lives, it was named after Stephen Hack, younger brother of John Barton Hack.

See also

List of mountains in Australia

References

Flinders Ranges
Hack
Far North (South Australia)